African Health Sciences is a peer-reviewed medical journal covering clinical practice and public health policy relevant to Africa and low-income countries. The editor-in-chief is James K. Tumwine (Makerere University), who established the journal in 2001.

The journal is abstracted and indexed by Index Medicus/MEDLINE/PubMed.

References

External links 
 

Public health journals
Open access journals
Quarterly journals
English-language journals
Publications established in 2001
Makerere University